Gafleispitz is a mountain in Liechtenstein in the Rätikon range of the Eastern Alps, to the east of Schaan, with a height of .

References

Mountains of the Alps
Mountains of Liechtenstein